In Greek mythology, Comus (Kōmos) is the god of festivity, revels and nocturnal dalliances. He is a son and a cup-bearer of the god Dionysus. He was represented as a winged youth or a child-like satyr and represents anarchy and chaos. His mythology occurs in the later times of antiquity. During his festivals in Ancient Greece, men and women exchanged clothes. He was depicted as a young man on the point of unconsciousness from drink. He had a wreath of flowers on his head and carried a torch that was in the process of being dropped. Unlike the purely carnal Pan or purely intoxicated Dionysos, Comus was a god of excess.

Comus in art 

A description of Comus as he appeared in painting is found in Imagines (Greek Εἰκόνες, translit. Eikones) by Philostratus the Elder, a Greek writer and sophist of the 3rd century AD.

Comus appears at the start of the masque Pleasure Reconciled to Virtue by Ben Jonson and in Les fêtes de Paphos (The Festivals of Paphos), an opéra-ballet by Jean-Joseph Cassanéa de Mondonville.

In John Milton's masque Comus, the god Comus is described as the son of Bacchus and Circe. This is a post-classical invention.

Comus is featured in the baroque operas Les plaisirs de Versailles by Marc-Antoine Charpentier and King Arthur by Henry Purcell and John Dryden, and in a masque, Comus, by Thomas Arne.

A selfish dandy, Comus Bassington, is the central character in the novel The Unbearable Bassington by Saki (H. H. Munro).

Cult British progressive folk group Comus took their name and much of the lyrical content of their 1971 album First Utterance from Comus.

Comus is seen in modern culture with the Mistick Krewe of Comus which is a Carnival krewe. It was founded in 1856 in New Orleans, Louisiana for the Mardi Gras there and is the oldest establishment of the festivity groups.

Primary sources 
Comus is seen in primary sources including in Philostratus of Lemnos's Imagines, describing artwork he saw.

Philostratus the Elder, Imagines 1.25:

Dionysos sails to the revels of [the island of] Andros and, his ship now moored in the harbour, he leads a mixed throng of Satyroi (Satyrs) and Bakkhantes (Bacchantes) and all the Seilenoi (Silens). He leads Gelos (Laughter) and Komos (Comus, Revelry), two spirits most gay and most fond of the drinking-bout, that with the greatest delight he may reap the river's harvest.

References

 Text and gallery at Theoi Greek Mythology

External links
 

Nature gods
Greek gods
Children of Dionysus
Demigods in classical mythology
Satyrs